Hydrophyllum macrophyllum, commonly known as the hairy waterleaf or largeleaf waterleaf, is a species of plant in the borage family. It is native to the eastern United States where it is found primarily in the Midwest and Upper South.

Its natural habitat is forests with mesic, rocky, calcareous soil. It is a perennial that produces cream-colored flowers in late spring.

References

macrophyllum